Giovanni Delfino (30 May 1529 – 1 May 1584) was a Roman Catholic prelate who served as Bishop of Brescia (1579–1584), Apostolic Nuncio to Emperor (1571–1577), and Bishop of Torcello (1563–1579).

Biography
Giovanni Delfino was born in Venice, Italy on 30 May 1529. 
On 3 January 1563, he was appointed during the papacy of Pope Pius IV as Bishop of Torcello.
On 29 May 1571, he was appointed during the papacy of Pope Pius V as Apostolic Nuncio to Emperor, a position he held until December 1577. 
On 26 August 1579, he was appointed during the papacy of Pope Gregory XIII as Bishop of Brescia. 
He served as Bishop of Brescia until his death on 1 May 1584in Brescia, Italy.

While bishop, he was the principal consecrator of Lambert Gruter, Bishop of Wiener Neustadt (1574) and the principal co-consecrator of Tommaso Sperandio Corbelli, Bishop of Trogir (1567).

References

External links and additional sources
 (for Chronology of Bishops) 
 (for Chronology of Bishops) 
 (for Chronology of Bishops) 
  (for Chronology of Bishops) 
  (for Chronology of Bishops) 

16th-century Roman Catholic bishops in the Republic of Venice
Bishops appointed by Pope Pius IV
Bishops appointed by Pope Pius V
Bishops appointed by Pope Gregory XIII
1529 births
1584 deaths
Apostolic Nuncios to the Holy Roman Empire